Ardington is a village and civil parish about  east of Wantage in the Vale of White Horse.  It was part of Berkshire until the 1974 boundary changes transferred it to Oxfordshire. Since 2012 responsibility for Ardington and the neighbouring parish of Lockinge has been combined in a joint single parish council for Ardington and Lockinge.

Geography and economy
Ardington is a downland village, with its parish stretching from the loam rich north to the chalk downlands to the south.  The ancient path of the Ridgeway runs through the southern part of the parish, along the North Wessex Downs AONB section of the route.  Racing stables are beside and around the village most of which use the Downs for gallops. Being set in the Lockinge Estate, most of Ardington parish and nearby of East and West Lockinge are owned by Thomas Loyd and managed by Adkin Rural and Commercial.  Local amenities include a public house - The Boar's Head, a sports club, village store, post office and tearoom, and the Loyd-Lindsay Rooms - a set of rooms which are let out to the community and on a commercial basis for weddings, parties and conferences. Local charities can use the rooms to hold events to raise money.

Architecture
The oldest part of the Church of England parish church of Holy Trinity is the chancel arch, built about 1200. The Gothic Revival architect Joseph Clarke added the tower and spire in 1856. Somers Clarke remodelled the remainder of the church in 1887.  Ardington House was built for Edward Clarke in 1721 and has three tall storeys and seven window bays in breadth, not being deep, almost rectangular.  It has small wings without bays to each side (alternatively the entire front range can be described as projecting) topped by a classical triangular pediment framing a weathered mid-19th century coat of arms in stone (cartouche).  Its windows and central door are faced in complementary coloured brickwork dressings to its general grey brick façade. It is a Georgian Grade II* listed building and is open to the public in the summer months.

References

Sources

External links
 
 

Villages in Oxfordshire
Civil parishes in Oxfordshire
Vale of White Horse